John Edward Anderson may refer to:

 John E. Anderson (1917–2011), American businessman
 John Edward Anderson (psychologist) (1893–1966), American psychologist
 J. Edward Anderson (born 1927), American engineer